Ronald William Fordham Searle, CBE, RDI (3 March 1920 – 30 December 2011) was an English artist and satirical cartoonist, comics artist, sculptor, medal designer and illustrator. He is perhaps best remembered as the creator of St Trinian's School and for his collaboration with Geoffrey Willans on the Molesworth series.

Biography

Searle was born in Cambridge, England, where his father was a Post Office worker who repaired telephone lines. He started drawing at the age of five and left school (Central School – now Parkside School) at the age of 15. He trained at Cambridge College of Arts and Technology (now Anglia Ruskin University) for two years.

In April 1939, realizing that war was inevitable, he abandoned his art studies to enlist in the Royal Engineers. In January 1942, he was in the 287th Field Company, RE in Singapore.  After a month of fighting in Malaya, he was taken prisoner along with his cousin Tom Fordham Searle, when Singapore fell to the Japanese. He spent the rest of the war as prisoner, first in Changi Prison and then in the Kwai jungle, working on the Siam-Burma Death Railway.  Searle contracted both beriberi and malaria during his incarceration, which included numerous beatings, and his weight dropped to less than 40 kilograms. He was liberated in late 1945 with the final defeat of the Japanese.  After the war, he served as a courtroom artist at the Nuremberg trials and later the Adolf Eichmann trial (1961).

He married the journalist Kaye Webb in 1947; they had twins, Kate and Johnny. In 1961, Searle moved to Paris, leaving his family; the marriage ended in divorce in 1967. Later he married Monica Koenig, a painter, theatre and jewellery designer. After 1975, Searle and his wife lived and worked in the mountains of Haute Provence.

Searle's wife Monica died in July 2011 and he himself died on 30 December 2011, aged 91.

Early work as war artist

Although Searle published the first St Trinian's cartoon in the magazine Lilliput in 1941, his professional career really begins with his documentation of the brutal camp conditions of his period as a prisoner-of-war of the Japanese in World War II in a series of drawings that he hid under the mattresses of prisoners dying of cholera.  Searle recalled, "I desperately wanted to put down what was happening, because I thought if by any chance there was a record, even if I died, someone might find it and know what went on."  But Searle survived, along with approximately 300 of his drawings.  Liberated late in 1945, Searle returned to England, where he published several of the drawings in fellow prisoner Russell Braddon's The Naked Island. Another of Searle's fellow prisoners later recounted, "If you can imagine something that weighs six stone or so, is on the point of death and has no qualities of the human condition that aren't revolting, calmly lying there with a pencil and a scrap of paper, drawing, you have some idea of the difference of temperament that this man had from the ordinary human being."

Most of these drawings appear in his 1986 book, Ronald Searle: To the Kwai and Back, War Drawings 1939–1945. In the book, Searle also wrote of his experiences as a prisoner, including the day he woke up to find a dead friend on either side of him, and a live snake underneath his head:

At least one of his drawings is on display at the Changi Museum and Chapel, Singapore, but the majority of his originals are in the permanent collection of the Imperial War Museum, London, along with the works of other POW artists. The best known of these are John Mennie, Jack Bridger Chalker, Philip Meninsky and Ashley George Old.

Magazines, books, and films

Searle produced an extraordinary volume of work during the 1950s, including drawings for Life, Holiday and Punch. His cartoons appeared in The New Yorker, the Sunday Express and the News Chronicle. He compiled more St Trinian's books, which were based on his sister's school and other girls' schools in Cambridge. He collaborated with Geoffrey Willans on the Molesworth books (Down With Skool!, 1953, and How to be Topp, 1954), and with Alex Atkinson on travel books. In addition to advertisements and posters, Searle drew the title backgrounds of the Sidney Gilliat and Frank Launder film The Happiest Days of Your Life.

After moving to Paris in 1961, he worked more on reportage for Life and Holiday and less on cartoons. He also continued to work in a broad range of media and created books (including his well-known cat books), animated films and sculpture for commemorative medals, both for the French Mint and the British Art Medal Society. Searle did a considerable amount of designing for the cinema, and in 1965, he completed the opening, intermission and closing credits for the comedy film Those Magnificent Men in their Flying Machines as well as the 1969 film Monte Carlo or Bust! In 1975, the full-length cartoon Dick Deadeye, or Duty Done was released.  It is based on the character and songs from H.M.S. Pinafore.

Medallist

Searle designed the 1992 delegates medal for the FIDEM XXIII Congress London. It depicted a half-length bust of the renaissance medallist Pisanello and was struck by the Royal Mint. Other notable medals were "Searle at Seventy" (1990) and "Kwai 50th Anniversary" (1991) Medal both struck by Thomas Fattorini Ltd, and "Charles Dickens" (1983) struck by the Birmingham Mint.

Archives
In 2010, he gave about 2,200 of his works as permanent loans to Wilhelm Busch Museum, Hanover (Germany), now renamed Deutsches Museum für Karikatur und Zeichenkunst. Previously the summer palace of George I of Hanover, this museum also holds Searle's archives.

Awards
Searle received much recognition for his work, especially in America, including the National Cartoonists Society's Advertising and Illustration Award in 1959 and 1965, the Reuben Award in 1960, their Illustration Award in 1980 and their Advertising Award in 1986 and 1987. Searle was appointed Commander of the Order of the British Empire in 2004. In 2007, he was decorated with one of France's highest awards, the Chevalier de la Légion d'honneur, and in 2009, he received the German Lower Saxony Order of Merit.

Influence
His work has had a great deal of influence, particularly on American cartoonists, including Pat Oliphant, Matt Groening, Hilary Knight, and the animators of Disney's 101 Dalmatians.

He was an early influence on John Lennon's drawing style which featured in the books In His Own Write and A Spaniard in the Works. Anglia Ruskin University  has named the Ronald Searle Award for Creativity in the Arts in his honour.

Searle was an admiring friend of, and admired by, the great satirical humorist S. J. Perelman.  Searle was also a very important influence on the young Gerald Scarfe.

Bibliography

St Trinian's

 Hurrah For St Trinians, 1948
 The Female Approach: The Belles of St. Trinian's and Other Cartoons, 1950
 Back To The Slaughterhouse, and Other Ugly Moments, 1951
 The Terror of St Trinian's, or Angela's Prince Charming, 1952 (with Timothy Shy (D. B. Wyndham-Lewis))
 Souls in Torment, 1953 (preface by Cecil Day-Lewis)
 The St Trinian's Story, 1959 (with Kaye Webb)
 St Trinian's: The Cartoons, 2007
 St. Trinian's: The Entire Appalling Business, 2008

Molesworth

 Down With Skool!: A Guide to School Life for Tiny Pupils and Their Parents, 1953 (with Geoffrey Willans)
 How to be Topp: A Guide to Sukcess for Tiny Pupils, Including All There is to Kno About Space, 1954 (with Geoffrey Willans)
 Whizz for Atomms: A Guide to Survival in the 20th Century for Fellow Pupils, their Doting Maters, Pompous Paters and Any Others who are Interested, 1956 (with Geoffrey Willans) Published in the U.S. as Molesworth's Guide to the Atommic Age
 Back in the Jug Agane, 1959 (with Geoffrey Willans)
 The Compleet Molesworth, 1958 (collection) Molesworth (1999 Penguin reprint)

Other works

Forty Drawings (1946)
White Coolie, 1947 (with Ronald Hastain)
This England 1946–1949, 1949 (edited by Audrey Hilton)
The Stolen Journey, 1950 (with Oliver Philpot)
An Irishman's Diary, 1950 (with Patrick Campbell)
Dear Life, 1950 (with H. E. Bates)
Paris Sketchbook, 1950 (with Kaye Webb) (repr. 1958)
A Sleep of Prisoners, 1951 (with Christopher Fry)
Life in Thin Slices, 1951 (with Patrick Campbell)
The Naked Island, 1952 (with Russell Braddon)
It Must be True, 1952 (with Denys Parsons)
London—So Help Me!, 1952 (with Winifred Ellis)
The Diverting History of John Gilpin, 1953 (text by William Cowper)
Looking at London and People Worth Meeting, 1953 (with Kaye Webb)
Six Animal Plays, 1952 (text by Frank Carpenter)
The Dark is Light Enough, 1954 (with Christopher Fry)
Patrick Campbells Omnibus, 1954 (with Patrick Campbell)
The Journal of Edwin Carp, 1954 (edited by Richard Haydn)
Modern Types, 1955 (with Geoffrey Gorer)
The Rake's Progress, 1955
Merry England, Etc, 1956
Anglo-Saxon Attitudes, 1956 (with Angus Wilson)
The Big City or the New Mayhew , 1958 (with Alex Atkinson)
The Dog's Ear Book, 1958 (with Geoffrey Willans)
USA for Beginners, 1959 (with Alex Atkinson)
Anger of Achilles: Homer's Iliad, 1959 (translation by Robert Graves)
By Rocking Horse Across Russia, 1960 (with Alex Atkinson)
Penguin Ronald Searle, 1960
Refugees 1960: A Report in Words and Pictures, 1960 (with Kaye Webb)
The Biting Eye of Andre Francois (1960)
Which Way Did He Go?, 1961
A Christmas Carol, 1961 (with Charles Dickens)
The 13 Clocks and the Wonderful O, 1962 (with James Thurber)
Searle in the Sixties, 1964
From Frozen North to Filthy Lucre, 1964
Haven't We Met Before Somewhere?, 1966
Searle's Cats, 1967
The Square Egg, 1968
Take One Toad, 1968
This Business of Bomfog, 1969 (with Madelaine Duke)
Monte Carlo Or Bust, 1969 (with E. W. Hildick)
Hello, where did all the people go?, 1969
The Second Coming of Toulouse-Lautrec, 1969
Secret Sketchbook, 1969
The Great Fur Opera: Annals of the Hudson's Bay Company 1670–1970, 1970 (with Kildare Dobbs)
Scrooge, 1970 (with Elaine Donaldson)
Mr. Lock of St. James's Street, 1971 (with Frank Whitbourn)
The Addict, 1971
More Cats, 1975
Dick Dead Eye, 1975 (after Gilbert and Sullivan)
Paris! Paris!, 1977 (with Irwin Shaw)
Zodiac, 1977
Ronald Searle, 1978
The King of Beasts & Other Creatures, 1980
The Situation is Hopeless, 1980
Winning the Restaurant Game, 1980 (with Jay Jacobs)
Too Many Songs by Tom Lehrer With Not Enough Drawings by Ronald Searle, 1981
Ronald Searle's Big Fat Cat Book, 1982
The Illustrated Winespeak, 1983
Ronald Searle in Perspective, 1983
Ronald Searle's Golden Oldies 1941–1961, 1985
Something in the Cellar, 1986
To the Kwai and Back: War Drawings 1939–1945 (1986)
Ronald Searle's Non-Sexist Dictionary, 1988
Ah Yes, I Remember It Well...: Paris 1961–1975, 1988
Slightly Foxed But Still Desirable: Ronald Searle's Wicked World of Book Collecting, 1989
Marquis De Sade Meets Goody Two-Shoes, 1994
The Tales of Grandpa Cat, 1994 (with Lee Wardlaw)
The Hatless Man, 1995 (with Sarah Kortum)
A French Affair : The Paris Beat, 1965–1998, 1999 (with Mary Blume)
Wicked Etiquette, 2000 (with Sarah Kortum)
Ronald Searle in Le Monde, 2001
Railway of Hell: A Japanese POW's Account of War, Capture and Forced Labour, 2002 (with Reginald Burton)
Searle's Cats, 2005 (New and Expanded Edition, all illustrations are new)
The Scrapbook Drawings", 2005
Cat O' Nine Tales: And Other Stories, 2006 (with Jeffrey Archer)
Beastly Feasts: A Mischievous Menagerie in Rhyme, 2007 (with Robert Forbes)
More Scraps & Watteau Revisited, 2008
Let's Have a Bite!: A Banquet of Beastly Rhymes, 2010 (with Robert Forbes)
What! Already?: Searle at 90, 2010
Les Très Riches Heures de Mrs Mole, 2011
What Am I Still Doing Here?, 2011 (with Roger Lewis)

See also
Musée Tomi Ungerer/Centre international de l’illustration
 War artist

References

Further reading
"Ronald Searle: a life in pictures". Steve Bell, The Guardian. 9 March 2010.
"Aged 90, Ronald Searle recalls the bad girls of St Trinian's". Valerie Grove. Times Online. 20 February 2010.
"St Trinian's creator Searle reaches 90". Nicholas Glass. Channel 4 News. 2 March 2010.
Interview on BBC Radio 4, Desert Island Discs, 10 July 2005
1945 illustration – OECD Observer, No 246-247, Dec 2004 – Jan 2005 – (Retrieved 4 January 2012)
Scion of a Noble Line: Interview with Ronald Searle, The Guardian. December 2000.
Article by Harry Mount, The Spectator, 10 March 2010
Der freigezeichnete Gefangene, Wilhelm Platthaus, Frankfurter Allgemeine, 27 February 2010
 Ronald Searle in Perspective (1984)
 Ronald Searle, intro. by Henning Bock & essay by Paul Dehaye (1978)

External links

Biography and samples
Full bibliography
Ronald Searle & the St. Trinian's Cartoons

Ronald Searle in Le Monde
Comiclopedia: Ronald Searle

 Cover of the 1947 Christmas edition of the Radio Times, by Searle

1920 births
2011 deaths
Alumni of Anglia Ruskin University
Artists from Cambridge
British Army personnel of World War II
British World War II prisoners of war
Burma Railway prisoners
Chevaliers of the Légion d'honneur
Commanders of the Order of the British Empire
Courtroom sketch artists
English caricaturists
English cartoonists
English comics artists
English expatriates in France
English illustrators
English emigrants to France
Punch (magazine) cartoonists
Reuben Award winners
Royal Engineers soldiers
The New Yorker cartoonists
World War II prisoners of war held by Japan